Melehaneh (also Romanized as Meleḩāneh; also known as Malāneh, Melleh Hāneh, Molāḩāneh, Moleh Hāneh, and Molkhāneh) is a village in Kanduleh Rural District, Dinavar District, Sahneh County, Kermanshah Province, Iran. At the 2006 census, its population was 59, in 14 families.

References 

Populated places in Sahneh County